The following lists events that happened during 1919 in New Zealand.

Incumbents

Regal and viceregal
 Head of State  – George V
 Governor-General – Arthur Foljambe, 2nd Earl of Liverpool

Government
The 19th New Zealand Parliament concludes. The election held in November sees the Reform Party returned with an increased majority (47 of the 80 seats). Women are eligible to stand for Parliament for the first time.
 Speaker of the House – Frederic Lang (Reform Party)
 Prime Minister – William Massey (Reform Party)
 Minister of Finance – Joseph Ward until 21 August, then James Allen

Parliamentary opposition
 Leader of the Opposition – Joseph Ward (Liberal Party).

Judiciary
 Chief Justice – Sir Robert Stout

Main centre leaders
 Mayor of Auckland – James Gunson
 Mayor of Wellington – John Luke
 Mayor of Christchurch – Henry Holland then Henry Thacker
 Mayor of Dunedin – James Clark then William Begg

Events 
 1 February – Cecil McKenzie Hill, chief instructor for the Canterbury Aviation Company, is killed in an air accident while flying over Riccarton Racecourse. This is the first aircraft fatality in New Zealand.
 4 February – New Zealand Rifle Brigade (Earl of Liverpool's Own) disbanded.
 31 May – George Bolt flies from Auckland to Russell in a Boeing and Westervelt floatplane.
 16 December – George Bolt makes the first experimental airmail flight in New Zealand.
 16–17 December – The 1919 general election is held.
 December – The Ministry of External Affairs is established, with James Allen as the first minister.

Arts and literature

See 1919 in art, 1919 in literature, :Category:1919 books

Music

See: 1919 in music

Film

See: :Category:1919 film awards, 1919 in film, List of New Zealand feature films, Cinema of New Zealand, :Category:1919 films

Sport

 See: 1919 in sports, :Category:1919 in sports

Chess
 The National Chess championship was not held (the influenza epidemic was still subsiding at its traditional new year dates).

Cricket
 Plunket Shield: 25–29 December, Hagley Oval, Christchurch: Canterbury defeated Wellington by 7 wickets. See 1920 in New Zealand#Cricket for remaining matches in this Plunket Shield competition.

Football
 Provincial league champions:
 Auckland – North Shore
 Canterbury – Linwood, Excelsior (shared)
 Hawke's Bay – Waipukurau
 Otago – Northern
 Southland – No competition
 Wanganui – Eastbrooke
 Wellington – YMCA

Golf
 The ninth New Zealand Open championship is won by Ted Douglas (his third victory) after a playoff against Sloan Morpeth.
 The 23rd National Amateur Championships are held in Napier
 Men – H. E. Crosse (Napier) (second title)
 Women – N. E. Wright

Horse racing

Harness racing
 New Zealand Trotting Cup – Trix Pointer
 Auckland Trotting Cup – Creina

Thoroughbred racing
 New Zealand Cup – Vagabond
 Auckland Cup – Karo
 Wellington Cup – Red Ribbon  / Rewi Poto (dead heat)
 New Zealand Derby – Rossini

Lawn bowls
The national outdoor lawn bowls championships are held in Auckland.
 Men's singles champion – M. Walker (Ponsonby Bowling Club)
 Men's pair champions – J.B. Rosmon, W.J. Hueston (skip) (Gisborne Bowling Club)
 Men's fours champions – A.J. Andrew, W. Given, O. Gallagher, Ernie Jury (skip) (Karangahake Bowling Club)

Rugby union

Rugby league
 New Zealand national rugby league team

Births

January–February
 4 January – Joseph Collins, boxer
 23 January – Dorothy Winstone, educationalist and academic
 26 January
 Les Gandar, politician
 Hepi Te Heuheu, Ngāti Tūwharetoa leader
 4 February – Sam Cusack, community character
 5 February – William R. Newland, potter
 10 February – Dorothy Freed, author, composer, music historian
 12 February – Bob Miller, surveyor, Antarctic explorer, conservationist
 25 February – Jack Tizard, psychologist

March–April
 3 March – Henry Lang, public servant, economist
 6 March – Jim Knox, trade union leader
 7 March – John Wyatt, cricketer
 29 March – Lorrie Pickering, politician
 30 March – Robin Williams, mathematical physicist, university administrator, public servant
 5 April – Les Munro, World War II bomber pilot
 14 April – Lester Harvey, rugby union player
 16 April – Jan Nigro, artist
 29 April – Jack Ridley, civil engineer, politician

May–June
 10 May – Eric Godley, botanist, academic biographer
 16 May – Frank Callaway, music academic and administrator
 19 May – Peter Hooper, writer, conservationist
 28 May – Alex Lindsay, violinist, orchestral conductor and leader
 1 June – Michael Miles, television presenter
 2 June – Bert Walker, politician
 4 June – Alister McLellan, mathematician, physicist
 8 June – Guy Overton, cricketer
 13 June – Phyl Blackler, cricketer
 14 June – James Ward, World War II bomber pilot, Victoria Cross recipient
 15 June – Doug Harris, athlete
 16 June – Ces Mountford, rugby league player and coach
 28 June – Charles Willocks, rugby union player

July–August
 6 July – Ray Dowker, cricketer, association footballer
 14 July – Ray Dalton, rugby union player
 17 July – Alex Moir, cricketer
 20 July – Edmund Hillary, mountaineer, explorer, philanthropist
 22 July – Angus Tait, electronics innovator and businessman
 1 August – Colin McCahon, artist
 3 August – David Aubrey Scott, diplomat
 8 August – Hōri Mahue Ngata, lexicographer
 10 August – Murray Beresford Roberts, confidence trickster
 22 August – Dick Brittenden, sports journalist
 24 August – Colin Aikman, public servant, lawyer, diplomat, academic

September–October
 5 September – John Rangihau, academic, Māori leader
 24 September – Gordon Walters, artist, graphic designer
 25 September – Tony George, weightlifter
 29 September – Ruth Dallas, poet, children's author
 30 September – John Stacpoole, architect, historian
 7 October – James Boyer Brown, endocrinologist
 8 October – Mac Anderson, cricketer, air force officer
 11 October – John Warham, photographer, ornithologist
 20 October – John Karlsen, actor
 25 October
 George Burns, rower
 George Cawkwell, classical scholar

November–December
 6 November – Allen Lissette, cricketer
 7 November – Levi Borgstrom, carver
 9 November – Janet Paul, publisher, painter, art historian
 11 November – Lance Adams-Schneider, politician, diplomat
 25 November – Keith Lawrence, World War II pilot
 6 December – Cedric Hassall, chemist, academic
 10 December – Walter Robinson, Anglican bishop
 11 December – Lady Anne Berry, horticulturalist
 12 December – Ida Gaskin, school teacher, quiz show contestant, politician
 17 December – Rei Hamon, artist
 20 December – Bubbles Mihinui, tourist guide, community leader
 21 December – Jack Williams, politician
 29 December – Thomas Horton, air force pilot

Deaths

January–March
 21 January – Thomas Thompson, politician (born 1832)
 22 January – Carrick Paul, World War I flying ace (born 1893)
 2 February – Charles Begg, surgeon, army health administrator (born 1879)
 7 February – Donald Reid, farmer, landowner, businessman, politician (born 1833)
 13 February – William Temple, soldier, Victoria Cross recipient (born 1833)
 18 February – Searby Buxton, politician (born 1832)
 19 February – William Tucker, soldier, farmer, politician, mayor of Gisborne (1887–88) (born 1843)
 24 February – Alfred Fraser, politician (born 1862)
 18 March – Isabella Siteman, farmer, philanthropist (born 1842)
 25 March – Harry Burnand, engineer, sawmiller (born 1850)

April–June
 3 April
 Charlie Frith, cricket player and umpire (born 1854)
 Mary Hames, farmer, dressmaker (born 1827)
 23 April – Archie McMinn, rugby union player (born 1880)
 24 April – William Speight, politician (born 1843)
 6 May – Catherine Fulton, diarist, philanthropist, social reformer, suffragette (born 1829)
 28 May – Edward Bartley, architect (born 1839)
 1 June – Thomas William Adams, farmer, forester, educationalist (born 1842)
 4 June – John Sharp, politician, mayor of Nelson (1887–90) (born 1828)
 25 June – Hamilton Gilmer, politician (born 1838)
 29 June – James McKerrow, astronomer, surveyor, public servant (born 1834)

July–September
 22 July – Sir John Denniston, lawyer, jurist (born 1845)
 3 August – Stuart Newall, military leader (born 1843)
 6 August – James Dawe, cricketer (born 1844)
 13 August – Jackson Palmer, politician (born 1867)
 24 August – Thomas Broun, entomologist (born 1838)
 26 August – Richard Molesworth Taylor, politician (born 1835)
 4 September – Joseph Ivess, politician (born 1844)

October–December
 13 October – James Stack, missionary, writer, interpreter (born 1835)
 21 October – Alexander McMinn, teacher, journalist, newspaper proprietor (born 1842)
 29 October – James Colvin, politician (born 1844)
 3 November – Ellen Dougherty, nurse (born 1844)
 15 November – Maria Marchant, school principal (born 1869)
 24 November – George Randall Johnson, cricketer, politician (born 1833)
 11 December – Takaanui Hōhaia Tarakawa, Tapuika, Ngāti Rangiwewehi and Ngāi Te Rangi tohunga, historian and genealogist (born 1852)
 15 December – Louisa Snelson, civic leader (born 1844)
 18 December – Frederick Strouts, architect (born 1834)
 29 December – Wiremu Hoani Taua, Ngāti Kahu leader, school principal (born 1862)

See also
History of New Zealand
List of years in New Zealand
Military history of New Zealand
Timeline of New Zealand history
Timeline of New Zealand's links with Antarctica
Timeline of the New Zealand environment

References

External links